KF or Kf may refer to:

Businesses and brands:
 KF Aerospace, a Canadian aerospace company
 KF Cargo, a Canadian cargo airline
 KF Defence Programs, a Canadian defense contractor
 Korea Foundation
 Air Belgium, an airline based in Belgium (IATA code KF)
 Blue1, a defunct airline based in Finland (IATA code KF)
 Kettle Foods, a snack foods manufacturer
 Kooperativa Förbundet, a cooperative Swedish retail chain
 KrisFlyer, the frequent flyer program of Singapore Airlines
 A member of the Mazda K engine family
 Kiwi Farms

Games:
 Katamari Forever, a video game for the PlayStation 3
 Killing Floor (2009 video game), a cooperative survival horror video game

Science and technology:
 A member of the Mazda K engine family
 Kalman Filter, in mathematics
 Potassium fluoride, a chemical substance
 Klein Flange, a quick release vacuum flange
 Cryoscopic constant, Kf, related to freezing-point depression
 Karl Fischer titration
 Stability constants of complexes, abbreviated as Kf (constant of formation)
 Filtration coefficient.

Sports
 Knattspyrnufélag Fjallabyggðar, an Icelandic sports team